A lateral flap is a family of consonantal sounds, used in some spoken languages. 

There are four attested or claimed lateral flaps in the world's languages:
 The alveolar lateral flap  is quite common.
A retroflex lateral flap  is found throughout South Asia, from Pashtun to Oriya, in the Iwaidjan languages of Australia, and sporadically elsewhere.
A palatal lateral flap  has been described from Iwaidja, but may be a palatalized alveolar flap.
A velar lateral flap  occurs allophonically in Melpa and a few other languages of New Guinea.

Features
Features of lateral flap:

Lateral consonants